Koli Dance is a popular folk dance of the Maharashtra and Goa states of India. It was created by Kolis of Mumbai. The Koli Dance reflects the rhythm of the sea waves and all of the festivals of Kolis always celebrate with Koli dance. This characteristically lively dance of the Koli fisherwomen is special to Mumbai.

Notable Events 

 In 1961 on Republic day of India, Kolis of Maharashtra (Maharashtra was a newly formed state in 1960) performed the Koli Dance in Delhi as Republic Day Parade. Kolis even got Prime Minister Jawaharlal Nehru to dance with them, a Koli cap on Nehru's head.

 In November 2010, the President of America, Barack Obama with his wife Michelle Obama enjoyed the Koli dance and song 'Mi Hai Koli' with school students at Diwali festival.

See also 
 List of Koli people
 List of Koli states and clans

References 

Folk dances of Maharashtra
Indian folk dances
Goan dances
Koli people